Harry Allison Estep (February 1, 1884 – February 28, 1968) was an American  politician and Republican member of the U.S. House of Representatives from Pennsylvania.

Biography
Harry A. Estep was born in Pittsburgh, Pennsylvania.  He attended the public schools in Marion, Indiana, and Purdue University in Lafayette, Indiana.  He graduated from the University of Pittsburgh School of Law in 1913.  He was admitted to the bar in 1914 and commenced practice in Pittsburgh.  He served as assistant district attorney of Allegheny County, Pennsylvania, from 1917 to 1927.

Estep was elected as a Republican to the Seventieth, Seventy-first, and Seventy-second Congresses.  He was an unsuccessful candidate for reelection in 1932.  He resumed the practice of law until his retirement in 1964.  He died in Oakland, Pennsylvania, and is buried in Allegheny Cemetery.

Sources

The Political Graveyard

External links

Estep, Harry A.
Estep, Harry A.
Estep, Harry A.
Estep, Harry A.
Estep, Harry A.
University of Pittsburgh School of Law alumni
People from Marion, Indiana
Republican Party members of the United States House of Representatives from Pennsylvania
Burials at Allegheny Cemetery
20th-century American politicians
20th-century American lawyers